Enzo Artoni and Daniel Melo were the defending champions but only Melo competed that year with Ricardo Schlachter.

Melo and Schlachter lost in the first round to Nathan Healey and Jordan Kerr.

Scott Humphries and Mark Merklein won in the final 6–3, 7–6(7–1) against Gustavo Kuerten and André Sá.

Seeds

  Julian Knowle /  Michael Kohlmann (semifinals)
  Dominik Hrbatý /  Sjeng Schalken (first round)
  Martín García /  Martín Rodríguez (first round)
  Jeff Coetzee /  Chris Haggard (first round)

Draw

References
 2002 Brasil Open Men's Doubles Draw

Men's Doubles
Doubles